Uppaluri Siva Ramachandra Murty, or U. S. R. Murty (as he prefers to write his name), is a Professor Emeritus of the Department of Combinatorics and Optimization, University of Waterloo.

U. S. R. Murty received his Ph.D. in 1967 from the Indian Statistical Institute, Calcutta, with a thesis on extremal graph theory; his advisor was C. R. Rao.  Murty is well known for his work in matroid theory and graph theory, and mainly for being a co-author with J. A. Bondy of a textbook on graph theory. Murty has served as a managing editor and co-editor-in-chief of the Journal of Combinatorial Theory, Series B.

Selected publications
 John Adrian Bondy and U. S. R. Murty (1976), Graph Theory with Applications. North-Holland. Book's page at the University of Paris VI.
John Adrian Bondy and U. S. R. Murty (1979), "Graph Theory and Related Topics." Academic Press Inc. .
 U. S. R. Murty (1971)  How Many Magic Configurations are There? The American Mathematical Monthly.
 U. S. R. Murty (1971)  Equicardinal matroids. Journal of Combinatorial Theory, Series B
 U. S. R. Murty (1970) Matroids with Sylvester property. Aequationes Mathematicae.
 
 .

References

Canadian Hindus
Canadian people of Indian descent
Living people
Graph theorists
Academic staff of the University of Waterloo
20th-century Canadian mathematicians
Year of birth missing (living people)

Telugu people
People from Andhra Pradesh